Karl Deres (13 February 1930 – 27 March 2007) was a German politician of the Christian Democratic Union (CDU) and former member of the German Bundestag.

Life 
Karl Deres joined the CDU in 1960. He was a member of the Rhineland-Palatinate state parliament from 1975 to 1980. There he was elected via his constituency. From 1980 to 1994 he was a member of the German Bundestag for four terms. He was elected for the CDU via a direct mandate in Rhineland-Palatinate.

Literature

References

1930 births
2007 deaths
Members of the Bundestag for Rhineland-Palatinate
Members of the Bundestag 1990–1994
Members of the Bundestag 1987–1990
Members of the Bundestag 1983–1987
Members of the Bundestag 1980–1983
Members of the Bundestag for the Christian Democratic Union of Germany
Members of the Landtag of Rhineland-Palatinate